Adrián Charquero Paz (born 9 September 1966) is a Uruguayan football coach and former professional footballer.

He played as a midfielder, notably in the Premier League for Ipswich Town who were his only team in European football. He also had notable spells across North and South America for Vélez Sársfield, Estudiantes, Columbus Crew and Colorado Rapids. He also had spells in China with Shanghai Pudong, Tianjin Teda and Qingdao Etsong and had brief spells with Bella Vista and Peñarol. He was capped 10 times by Uruguay, scoring once.

Club career
After playing in Uruguay and Argentina, Paz moved to Ipswich Town during the 1994–95 season in a joint transfer with the Argentinian defender Mauricio Taricco. He became the first Uruguayan to play in the English Premier League.
In January 1996, Major League Soccer began allocating players to its newly established teams.  Paz was sent to the Columbus Crew where he played 27 games.  On February 1, 1997, the Crew sent Paz to the Colorado Rapids in exchange for the first-round selection in the 1997 MLS Supplemental Draft.  He spent two seasons in Colorado before moving to Tianjin Teda in 1999. He only played one game for Tianjin as he suffered a serious injury during his first game, against Shanghai Shenhua, and was out injured until the end of 1999. He rejoined Bella Vista in Uruguay in 2000, then went back to China for a third time, where he played for Qingdao Etsong before retiring from football at the end of the season.

International career
He made his debut for Uruguay in a friendly match against Brazil (1-0 win) on April 30, 1992, in the Estadio Centenario in Montevideo under coach Luis Alberto Cubilla.
He went on to score the winner in that game.

Coaching career
Paz now resides in Florida and runs a soccer academy.

References

External links

1966 births
Living people
Uruguayan footballers
Uruguay international footballers
1993 Copa América players
Association football forwards
C.A. Bella Vista players
Peñarol players
Club Atlético Vélez Sarsfield footballers
Estudiantes de La Plata footballers
Argentine Primera División players
Expatriate footballers in Argentina
Expatriate footballers in England
Ipswich Town F.C. players
Premier League players
Columbus Crew players
Colorado Rapids players
Tianjin Jinmen Tiger F.C. players
Uruguayan expatriate footballers
Expatriate soccer players in the United States
Expatriate footballers in China
Uruguayan expatriate sportspeople in China
Uruguayan expatriate sportspeople in Argentina
Uruguayan expatriate sportspeople in England
Uruguayan expatriate sportspeople in the United States
Major League Soccer players
Major League Soccer All-Stars